The Gorgon is a 1964 British horror film directed by Terence Fisher for Hammer Films. It stars Christopher Lee, Peter Cushing, Richard Pasco and Barbara Shelley.

Plot
Central Europe 1910: The village of Vandorf has suffered seven horrific murders in five years. In each case, the unfortunate victim has been turned to stone.

In the old millhouse on the edge of the forest, Sascha Cass tells her artist boyfriend Bruno Heitz she is carrying his child. Wanting to stand up to his obligations, Bruno races off into the night to see Sascha's father despite her pleas for him not to go. She races after him, but soon loses him in the dark forest. There, amongst the dark shadows, something catches her attention. She looks into the face of something hideous and screams. Raising her head once more, she looks upon the horror and screams again before dying. Upon examination of the body, Dr. Namaroff, a local brain specialist at the Vandorf Medical Institution, discovers the body has turned to stone. Suspicion immediately falls onto Bruno, who is missing, but he is found hanged in the forest by a police search party. An incompetent inquest decides it is a case of murder and suicide and Dr. Namaroff doesn't reveal the condition of Cass' corpse.

The villagers, feeling robbed of any vengeance, attack Bruno's father, Professor Jules Heitz. The local Police warn the Professor to leave the village, but he refuses to go until his son's name is cleared. He seeks help from Dr. Namaroff. Heitz knows that a conspiracy of silence has been set up and that the villagers do not believe the true cause. Professor Heitz believes the murders are the result of something unhuman and hideous from Ancient Mythology. Its spirit haunts the Castle Borski; its name is Megeara, a Gorgon, a creature whose horrible face can turn human skin to stone. On hearing Hertz's belief, Namaroff immediately terminates their discussion.

Professor Heitz contacts his good friend Professor Meister of Leipzig University, who is also his son Paul's tutor. Paul immediately leaves to see his father. That night, Professor Heitz is drawn to Borski Castle by a strange calling sound. There, amongst the shadows, he looks upon something horrible; the face of Megeara the Gorgon. He manages to stagger back to the millhouse, and there, whilst slowly turning to stone, outlines a letter to his son Paul telling him of the horror that haunts Vandorf. His final words ‘I am turning to stone.’ Paul arrives, and learning the sad news of his father's death, goes to see  Namaroff. He is rudely dismissed when he asks if there is any link with the supernatural his father wrote of in his dying letter. Paul does however gain sympathy from Professor Namaroff's beautiful assistant Carla Hoffman, who visits him at the old millhouse and secretly reads the letter Professor Heitz had written. Later, she recites what she can remember of the letter to Namaroff at the Institution. They are interrupted by Ratoff, the warden who reports that Martha, a violent inmate, has escaped. Namaroff reveals to Carla that the spirit of Megeara the Gorgon does exist and occasionally takes over the body of an unfortunate human being.

That night, Paul is drawn outside the millhouse by a strange sound and there glimpses the horror of the Gorgon's reflection in the garden pool. He wakes five days later in the Medical Institution, aged by ten years. Determined to destroy the creature, Paul returns to the millhouse. Namaroff has Carla followed by Ratoff. That night, there is a full moon. Under the full moon, Paul visits the graveyard and exhumes his father's body and discovers it is solid stone. Carla silently watches him from the shadows. Emerging from her hiding place, she confides to Paul that Namaroff is in love with her and she is terrified of him. Paul tells Carla that he will take her away with him when the horror is ended. But Carla fears it will be too late by then.

Paul's tutor Professor Meister arrives at the millhouse to see him. Meanwhile, at the Medical Institution, Namaroff removes the brain from Martha, the dangerous inmate who died soon after recapture by Ratoff. Carla believed Martha to be the main suspect in the murders, but now she senses a far worse suspicion. Meister and Paul visit Inspector Kanof. They force him to tell them that Carla arrived in Vandorf as an amnesiac prior to the first murder.

Meeting in secret at Castle Borski early next morning, Carla tells Paul that she will go away with him to safety, but it must be now. He refuses and she runs off. Paul runs after her and is attacked by a waiting Ratoff, but Meister scares him off. Meister tells Paul he believes that Carla becomes an amnesiac during the full moon. It is during that period that the spirit of Megeara enters her body. Paul agrees with Carla that to leave now is the best thing, but she must leave immediately and he will follow later when the mystery is solved. Later that day Paul cables Leipzig where Carla is supposed to have arrived by train, but there is no sign of her.

That night he goes to Castle Borski as a full moon is rising. There midst the Castle ruins, Namaroff is waiting with a sword for the arrival of Carla. He attacks Paul and they fight. As the fight continues the Gorgon appears at the top of the Castle staircase. Namaroff seizes the chance and races forward to behead the creature, but he looks upon its face and is turned to stone. Paul is trapped as the creature advances on him and he sees her reflection in a mirror. Silently Professor Meister approaches from behind clutching Namaroff's sword. With a swift slash of the blade he beheads the creature - but it is too late to save Paul who is now dying. Slowly turning to stone, Paul looks upon the severed head of the Gorgon as its features change to that of his beloved Carla.

Cast

 Christopher Lee as Professor Karl Meister
 Peter Cushing as Dr. Namaroff
 Richard Pasco as Paul Heitz
 Barbara Shelley as Carla Hoffman
 Michael Goodliffe as Professor Jules Heitz
 Jack Watson as Ratoff
 Patrick Troughton as Inspector Kanof
 Prudence Hyman as Megaera
 Joyce Hemson as Martha
 Toni Gilpin as Sascha Cass
 Jeremy Longhurst as Bruno Heitz
 Joseph O'Conor as the Coroner
 Alister Williamson as Janus Cass
 Michael Peake as the Constable
 Redmond Phillips as Hans

Production
The Gorgon was based on a story submitted to Hammer by their Canadian fan, J. Llewellyn Divine. Director John Gilling and producer Anthony Nelson Keys expanded on Divine's outline, developing it into a screenplay. For the role of the monster, former ballerina Prudence Hyman was recruited because the monster was supposed to float gracefully like a wraith. Filming occurred at Bray Studios in Berkshire.

Release
The Gorgon was distributed in the United Kingdom by Columbia Pictures/BLC Films on October 18, 1964 where it was supported by The Curse of the Mummy's Tomb. It was released in the United States by Columbia Pictures on February 17, 1965 where it was also supported by The Curse of the Mummy's Tomb.

The Gorgon was released in the U.S. on Blu-ray by Mill Creek Entertainment in March 2018 as a double feature along with the Hammer movie, The Two Faces of Dr. Jekyll. The title of the film is misspelled as “The Gorgan” on the spine.

Reception
Variety wrote, "Though written and directed on a leisurely note, 'The Gorgon' is a well-made, direct yarn that mainly gets its thrills through atmosphere. The period storyline is simple and predictable, but John Gilling has turned out a well-rounded piece and Terence Fisher's direction is restrained enough to avoid any unintentional yocks." The Monthly Film Bulletin found that the monster's appearance was "belated, vague and insufficiently spectacular. Still, it makes a change from vampires, and though the film has little genuine flair for atmosphere it is quite well acted by Richard Pasco and an appropriately blank-eyed, statuesque Barbara Shelley."

In other media 
The Gorgon was adapted into a 17-page comics story by Scott Goodall, with art by Trevor Goring and Alberto Cuyas, which was told in two parts in the magazine The House of Hammer, issues #11 and 12, published in August 1977 and September 1977 by General Books Distribution (an imprint of Thorpe & Porter).

References

Sources

External links

 

The Gorgon at BFI Screenonline

1964 films
1964 horror films
1960s monster movies
British horror films
British monster movies
Films adapted into comics
Films directed by Terence Fisher
Films scored by James Bernard
Films set in 1910
Films set in castles
Films set in Germany
Films shot at Bray Studios
Gothic horror films
Hammer Film Productions horror films
1960s English-language films
1960s British films